Nino Dirnbek (born 29 March 1990) is a Slovenian football defender who plays for Bistrica.

He played with Nafta Lendava in the 2011–12 Slovenian PrvaLiga.

References

External links
 
 

1990 births
Living people
People from Ptuj
Association football defenders
Slovenian footballers
Slovenian expatriate footballers
Slovenian expatriate sportspeople in Slovakia
Slovenian expatriate sportspeople in Germany
Slovenian expatriate sportspeople in the Czech Republic
Slovenian expatriate sportspeople in Serbia
Expatriate footballers in Slovakia
Expatriate footballers in Germany
Expatriate footballers in the Czech Republic
Expatriate footballers in Serbia
NK Nafta Lendava players
FK Donji Srem players
Slovenian PrvaLiga players
Serbian First League players